Ajdin Penava (born March 11, 1997) is a Bosnian basketball player for Spójnia Stargard of the Polish Basketball League (PLK). He played college basketball for Marshall University in the Conference USA (C-USA). He led NCAA Division I in blocks per game (3.94) in 2017–18.

Early life
Penava attended Peta Gimnazija in Sarajevo, Bosnia and Herzegovina.

College career
Penava was a reserve player during his first two seasons with the Herd. He had his breakout season as a junior when he became a full-time starter. One of his best games came against the Ohio Bobcats where he had 33 points, 15 rebounds, and 9 blocks in a 99–96 win. He would later help lead Marshall to an upset win against Wichita State in the 2018 NCAA tournament scoring 16 points, grabbing 8 rebounds, and blocking 3 shots. Penava led the nation in blocks during 2017–18 season and decided to declare for the 2018 NBA draft at season's end. He initially did not sign with an agent, but decided to do so on April 19. He did not return to Marshall for his senior season.

|-
| align="left" | 2015–16
| align="left" | Marshall
| 18 || 1 || 6.1 || .387 || .143 || .692 || 1.0 || 0.2 || 0.1 || 0.4 || 1.9
|-
| align="left" | 2016–17
| align="left" | Marshall
| 35 || 14 || 15.5 || .517 || .225 || .781 || 3.9 || 0.5 || 0.4 || 1.0 || 6.1
|-
| align="left" | 2017–18
| align="left" | Marshall
| 34 || 34 || 29.4 || .562 || .340 || .753 || 8.5 || 1.9 || 0.9 || 4.9 || 15.6
|- class="sortbottom"
| style="text-align:center;" colspan="2"| Career
| 87 || 49 || 19.0 || .538 || .291 || .758 || 5.1 || 1.0 || 0.6 || 2.1 || 9.0

Professional career
On September 2, 2018, Penava signed a four-year deal with Kirolbet Baskonia of the Liga ACB and the EuroLeague. On February 26, 2019, Penava joined to the Baskonia reserve team. On July 6, 2020, Penava signed with Belfius Mons-Hainaut of the Pro Basketball League. In July 2021, Penava extended his contract with two more years until 2023.

On December 27, 2022, he signed with Spójnia Stargard of the Polish Basketball League (PLK).

National team career
Penava played for the Bosnian national team during the 2015 FIBA Europe Under-18 Championship. Penava averaged 5.6 ppg and 4.8 rpg during the tournament.

References

External links
Marshall profile

1997 births
Living people
Basketball players from Sarajevo
Belfius Mons-Hainaut players
Bosnia and Herzegovina expatriate basketball people in Belgium
Bosnia and Herzegovina expatriate basketball people in Poland
Bosnia and Herzegovina expatriate basketball people in Spain
Bosnia and Herzegovina expatriate basketball people in the United States
Bosnia and Herzegovina men's basketball players
Marshall Thundering Herd men's basketball players
Power forwards (basketball)
Saski Baskonia players
Spójnia Stargard players